The Last Chance Range of California is located near the Nevada state line in eastern Inyo County in the United States.

The range lies in a generally north–south direction, and stretches for more than 30 miles. The mountains lie to the northwest of the Cottonwood Mountains, and are almost entirely within Death Valley National Park, except for a small area near the Sulphur Mine in the north. The range reaches an elevation of 8,674 feet above sea level at Dry Mountain in the southern part of the range.

The Racetrack Playa is to the southwest.

References

Mountain ranges of the Mojave Desert
Mountain ranges of Inyo County, California
Death Valley